Welsh-language literature  has been produced continuously since the emergence of Welsh from Brythonic as a distinct language in around the 5th century AD.  The earliest Welsh literature was poetry, which was extremely intricate in form from its earliest known examples, a tradition sustained today. Poetry was followed by the first British prose literature in the 11th century (such as that contained in the Mabinogion). Welsh-language literature has repeatedly played a major part in the self-assertion of Wales and its people. It continues to be held in the highest regard, as evidenced by the size and enthusiasm of the audiences attending the annual National Eisteddfod of Wales (Eisteddfod Genedlaethol Cymru), probably the largest amateur arts festival in Europe, which crowns the literary prize winners in a dignified ceremony.

Middle Ages
The mediaeval period had three chronological stages of poetry: The Earliest poets (Cynfeirdd), Poets of the Princes, and the Poets of Nobility. Additionally, storytelling practices were continuous throughout the middle ages in Wales.

Early Poets (Cynfeirdd), c. 550-1100 
The earliest extant poets wrote praise poems for rulers and lords of Welsh dynasties from Strathclyde to Cornwall.

The Cynfeirdd is a modern term which is used to refer to the earliest poets that wrote in Welsh and Welsh poetry dating before 1100. These poets (beirdd) existed in the modern geographical definition of Wales in addition to the Old North (Yr Hen Ogledd) and the language of the time was a common root called Brittonic, a precursor to the Welsh language. The bards Taliesin and Aneirin are among nine poets mentioned in the medieval book Historia Brittonum. There is also anonymous poetry that survives from the period. The dominant themes or "modes" of the period are heroic elegies that celebrate and commemorate heroes of battle and military success.

The beirdd (bards) were also mentioned in Hywel Dda's Welsh law.

Poets of the Princes (Beirdd y Tywysogion), c. 1100-1300 
In the 11th century, Norman influence and challenge disrupted Welsh cultures, and the language developed into Middle Welsh. 

The next period is the Poets of the Princes, which is the period from c. 1100 until the conquest of Wales by King Edward of England in 1282-83. 

The poets of the princess is heavily associated with the princes of Gwynedd including Gruffudd ap Cynan, Llywelyn the Great and Llywelyn ap Gruffudd. Tradition states that Gruffydd ap Cynan helped to develop the tradition and regulation of poetry and music in Wales. The Arglwydd Rhys ap Gruffydd (Lord Rhys) is also associated with this development in Cardigan, Ceredigion and one chronicler describes how an assembly where musicians and bards competed for chairs.

Th society of the court poets came to a sudden end in 1282 following the killing of Llewelyn ap Gruffydd, the last of native Welsh princes. Llywelyn was slain in an ambush and his head was placed on the Tower of London "with an iron pole through it". The poets of the princes describe the grief surrounding his death, for example Gruffydd ap yr Ynad Goch (translated from Welsh), "Cold is the heart under my breast for terror and sadness for the King," and he goes on: "Woe is me for my lord, a hero without reproach,/ Woe is me for the adversity, that he should have stumbled .... Mine it is to praise him, without break, with- out end,/ Mine it is to think of him for a long time,/ Mine it is to live out my lifetime sad because of him,/For mine is sorrow, mine is weeping."

Poets of Nobility (Beirdd yr Uchelwyr), c. 1300-1500 
The next stage was the Poets of the Nobility which includes poetry of the period between the Edwardian Conquest of 1282/3 and the death of Tudur Aled in 1526.

The highest levels of the poetic art in Welsh are intensely intricate. The bards were extremely organised and professional, with a structured training which lasted many years. As a class, they proved very adaptable: when the princely dynasties ended in 1282, and Welsh principalities were annexed by England, they found necessary patronage with the next social level, the uchelwyr, or landed gentry. The shift led creatively to innovation – the development of the cywydd metre, with looser forms of structure.

The professionalism of the poetic tradition was sustained by a guild of poets, or Order of bards, with its own "rule book". This "rule book" emphasised their professional status, and the making of poetry as a craft. An apprenticeship of nine years was required for a poet to be fully qualified. The rules also set out the payment a poet could expect for his work – these payments varied according to how long a poet had been in training and also the demand for poetry at particular times during the year.

Storytellers (Cyfarwyddiaid) 
There were also cyfarwyddiaid (sing. cyfarwydd), storytellers. These were also professional, paid artists; but, unlike the poets, they seem to have remained anonymous. It is not clear whether these storytellers were a wholly separate, popular level class, or whether some of the bards practised storytelling as part of their repertoire. Little of this prose work has survived, but even so it provides the earliest British prose literature. These native Welsh tales and some hybrids with French/Norman influence form a collection known in modern times as the Mabinogion. The name became established in the 19th century but is based on a linguistic mistake (a more correct term is Mabinogi).

Welsh literature in the Middle Ages also included a substantial body of laws, genealogies, religious and mythical texts, histories, medical and gnomic lore, and practical works, in addition to literature translated from other languages such as Latin, Breton or French. Besides prose and longer poetry, the literature includes the distinctive Trioedd, Welsh Triads, short lists usually of three items, apparently used as aids to memory.

16th and 17th centuries

The 16th and 17th centuries in Wales, as in the rest of Europe, were a period of great change. Politically, socially, and economically the foundations of modern Wales were laid at this time. In the Laws in Wales Acts 1535-1542 Wales was annexed and integrated fully into the English kingdom, losing any vestiges of political or legal independence.

End of the guild of poets
From the middle of the 16th century onwards, a decline is seen in the praise tradition of the poets of the nobility, the cywyddwyr. It became more and more difficult for poets to make their living — primarily for social reasons beyond their control. 

The Dissolution of the Monasteries, which had become important sources of patronage for the poets, and the anglicisation of the nobility during the Tudor period, exemplified by the Laws in Wales Acts, meant that there were fewer and fewer patrons willing or able to support the poets. But there were also internal reasons for the decline: the conservatism of the Guild of poets, or Order of bards, made it very difficult for it to adapt to the new world of Renaissance learning and the growth of printing.

However, the Welsh poetic tradition with its traditional metres and cynghanedd (patterns of alliteration) did not disappear, but came into the hands of ordinary poets who kept it alive through the centuries. Cynghanedd and traditional metres are still used today by many Welsh-language poets.

Renaissance learning
By 1571 Jesus College, Oxford, was founded to provide an academic education for Welshmen, and the commitment of certain individuals, both Protestant and Roman Catholic, ensured that the Welsh language would be part of the new Renaissance in learning.

First printed Welsh book
In 1546 the first book to be printed in Welsh was published, Yny lhyvyr hwnn ("In this book") by Sir John Price of Brecon. John Price (c. 1502-55) was an aristocrat and an important civil servant. He served as Secretary of the Council of Wales and the Marches and he was also one of the officers responsible for administration of the Dissolution of the Monasteries in the area. He was also a scholar who embraced the latest ideas relating to religion and learning: reform and humanism. It is also known that he was a collector of manuscripts on various subjects, including the history and literature of Wales.

Other humanists and scholars
Shortly afterwards the works of William Salesbury began to appear. Salesbury was an ardent Protestant and coupled his learning with the new religious ideas from the Continent; he translated the New Testament into Welsh and compiled an English-Welsh dictionary, among other works. On the other hand, Gruffudd Robert was an ardent Catholic, but in the same spirit of learning published an important Welsh grammar while in enforced exile in Milan in 1567. A huge step forward for both the Welsh language and its literature was the publication, in 1588, of a full-scale translation of the Bible by William Morgan.

Other works
Most of the works published in the Welsh language for at least the next century were religious in nature. Morgan Llwyd, a Puritan, wrote in both English and Welsh, recounting his spiritual experiences. Other notable writers of the period included Vavasor Powell.

During this period, poetry also began to take a religious turn. William Pugh was a Royalist and a Catholic. By now, women as well as men were writing, but little of their work can be identified. Katherine Philips of Cardigan Priory, although English by birth, lived in Wales for most of her life, and was at the centre of a literary coterie comprising both sexes.

Beginnings of Welsh writing in English
The seeds of Anglo-Welsh literature can also be detected, particularly in the work of Henry Vaughan and his contemporary, George Herbert, both Royalists.

18th century
In the 18th century the trend towards religious literature continued and grew even stronger as Nonconformism began to take hold in Wales. The Welsh Methodist revival, initially led by Howell Harris and Daniel Rowland, produced not only sermons and religious tracts, but also hymns and poetry by William Williams Pantycelyn, Ann Griffiths and others. The Morris brothers of Anglesey were leading figures in the establishment of the London Welsh societies, and their correspondence is an important record of the time. The activities of the London Welshmen helped ensure that Wales retained some kind of profile within Britain as a whole.

The activities of a number of individuals, including Thomas Jones of Corwen and the Glamorgan stonemason and man of letters,  Iolo Morganwg, led to the institution of the National Eisteddfod of Wales and the invention of many of the traditions which surround it today. Although Iolo is sometimes called a charlatan because so many of his "discoveries" were based on pure myth, he was also an inveterate collector of old manuscripts, and thereby performed a service without which Welsh literature would have been the poorer. Some of the Welsh gentry continued to patronise bards, but this practice was gradually dying out.

19th century
Largely as a result of the Industrial Revolution, there was a large influx of people into the South Wales Valleys during the 19th century.  Although many of them were English, some made an effort to learn the Welsh language in order to integrate into the local communities, and there was increased demand for literature in the form of books, periodicals, newspapers, poetry, ballads and sermons. Some of the wealthier incomers, such as Lady Charlotte Guest, Lady Llanover and others, were of active assistance in the trend towards a richer cultural life. Thanks partly to the eisteddfodau, writing became a popular pastime, and all forms of poetry thrived.

Poets now used their bardic names to disguise their identity in competitions, and continued to use them when they became well known. The most celebrated poets of the century were: Evan Evans, John Blackwell, William Thomas and John Ceiriog Hughes, who went by the bardic names of "Ieuan Glan Geirionydd", "Alun", "Islwyn" and "Ceiriog" respectively.

The novel had been slow to pick up momentum in Wales. Translations of works such as Uncle Tom's Cabin existed, but the first recognised novelist in the Welsh language was Daniel Owen, author of Rhys Lewis (1885) and Enoc Huws (1891), among others.

20th century onwards

In the late 19th and early 20th centuries, Welsh literature began to reflect the way the Welsh language was increasingly becoming a political symbol.  Two of the greatest figures in the literary history of this period were the prolific Saunders Lewis and the writer/publisher Kate Roberts. Lewis, who had been brought up in Liverpool, was a leader of the nationalist movement, jailed for his part in protests; he chose drama as a means of pleading the rightness of his cause. Novelist Kate Roberts worked as a teacher, and was one of few writers to have lived in and written about both North Wales and South Wales.

The industrialisation of parts of Wales was now beginning to be regarded as a mixed blessing, and the old agricultural (agrarian) way of life which persisted in most of the country was idealised by many writers. However, a more realistic picture of Gwynedd farming communities between the Wars was presented by John Ellis Williams (1924-2008) in both English and Welsh. His reminiscences appeared in community newspapers, the Countryman magazine, and subsequently in paperback format in English under the titles of Clouds of Time and other Stories (1989) and Rare Welsh Bits (2000). A free spirit in the Welsh publishing circle, Williams was neither an academic nor a politician, but had embraced Existentialism in post-Second World War France and had an active friendship and correspondence with Simone de Beauvoir. The 1940s also saw the creation of a notable writing group in the Rhondda, called the "Cadwgan Circle". Writing almost entirely in the Welsh language, the movement, formed by J. Gwyn Griffiths and his wife Käthe Bosse-Griffiths, included the Welsh writers Pennar Davies, Rhydwen Williams, James Kitchener Davies and Gareth Alban Davies.

In the 1990s there was a distinct trend towards postmodernism in Welsh prose writing, especially evident in the work of such authors as Wiliam Owen Roberts and Mihangel Morgan.

Meanwhile, Welsh poetry, which had been verging on stagnation, took on a new lease of life as poets sought to regain mastery over the traditional verse forms, partly to make a political point. Alan Llwyd and Dic Jones were leaders in the field. Female poets such as Menna Elfyn gradually began to make their voices heard, overcoming the obstacle of the male-dominated bardic circle and its conventions.

The scholar Sir Ifor Williams also pioneered scientific study of the earliest Welsh written literature, as well as the Welsh language itself, recovering the works of poets like Taliesin and Aneirin from the uncritical fancies of various antiquarians, such as the Reverend Edward Davies who believed the theme of Aneirin's Gododdin was the massacre of the Britons at Stonehenge in 472.

See also

Association of Welsh Translators and Interpreters
Breton literature
Cornish literature
Dafydd ap Gwilym
Four Ancient Books of Wales
Black Book of Carmarthen
Book of Taliesin
Book of Aneirin
Red Book of Hergest
Geoffrey of Monmouth
Iolo Morganwg
List of Welsh language authors
List of Welsh language poets
List of Welsh writers
Literature in the other languages of Britain
Thirteen Treasures of the Island of Britain
Welsh comics
Welsh literature in English
Welsh mythology
Welsh Triads

References

Sources

External links
Welsh Writers A to Z
Welsh Writers

 
Books about Wales
History of literature in the United Kingdom
 

ca:Literatura gal·lesa
cy:Llenyddiaeth Gymraeg
es:Literatura de Gales
fr:Littérature celtique galloise
no:Walisisk litteratur
ru:Валлийская литература